Brandin Podziemski (born February 25, 2003) is an American college basketball player for Santa Clara Broncos of the West Coast Conference. He previously played at Illinois.

Early life and high school
Podziemski grew up in Muskego, Wisconsin and attended St. John's Northwestern Military Academy. He was named first team All-State after averaging 22.5 points and 9.3 rebounds per game as a sophomore after not playing on the varsity team as a freshman. Podziemski averaged 27.6 points and 9.2 rebounds and repeated as a first team All-State selection during his junior season. He was named Wisconsin Mr. Basketball as a senior after averaging 35.1 points, 10.0 rebounds, 5.6 assists, and 4.0 steals per game. Podziemski was rated a four-star recruit and committed to play college basketball at Illinois over offers from Kentucky, Miami (Fla.), Vanderbilt, and Wake Forest.

College career
Podziemski began his college basketball career with the Illinois Fighting Illini. He played in 16 games as a freshman, all off the bench, and averaged 1.4 points per game. After the end of the season, Podziemski entered the NCAA transfer portal.

Podziemski ultimately transferred to Santa Clara. He entered his first season with the Broncos as the team's starting shooting guard. Podziemski scored 30 points in Santa Clara's season opener against Eastern Washington as the Broncos won 84-72. He scored 34 points and grabbed 11 rebounds in the following game against Georgia Southern. At the close of the 2022–23 season, he was named WCC co-Player of the Year, sharing the award with Drew Timme of Gonzaga.

References

External links
Illinois Fighting Illini bio
Santa Clara Broncos bio

2003 births
Living people
American men's basketball players
Basketball players from Wisconsin
Illinois Fighting Illini men's basketball players
Santa Clara Broncos men's basketball players